NGC 317 is a pair of interacting galaxies, consisting of a lenticular galaxy (PGC 3442) and a spiral galaxy (PGC 3345), in the constellation Andromeda. It was discovered on October 1, 1885 by Lewis Swift.

References

0317
18851001
Andromeda (constellation)
Interacting galaxies
003442